The House of the Blackheads is a building situated in the old town of Riga, Latvia. The original building was erected during the first third of the 14th century for the Brotherhood of Blackheads, a guild for  unmarried merchants, shipowners, and foreigners in Riga. Major works were done in the early 17th century, adding most of the Mannerist ornamentation. The sculptures were made by the workshop of August Volz. Additionally, it is the site of the first decorated Christmas tree, which was erected in 1510.

The building was bombed to a ruin by the Germans on June 28, 1941 — a week after the launching of Operation Barbarossa — and the remains were demolished by the Soviets in 1948. It was rebuilt between 1996 and 1999 with funds provided by Valērijs Kargins, the president of Parex Bank. Part of the funds donated were from all the people who wanted to participate in the rebuilding process, by joining in the event ''I build the House of the Black Heads'', where by donating 5 lats (approximately 7-11 EUR) they could symbolically put a brick on the wall. There were more than 5,000 participants. The House of the Black Heads was officially opened on December 9, 1999.

Today the House of the Blackheads is a museum. In the upper level are located grand ballrooms, where historically many luxurious events happened — welcoming ceremonies for kings, queens, presidents, and also many cultural events — balls, classical music concerts, theatre performances, and operas with many world famous guest-stars. On another floor it is possible to visit the historic cabinets — a temporary work-space for the President of Latvia, who moved the Presidential residence to the House of the Blackheads from 2012 to 2016, while the permanent location in Riga Castle was under reconstruction. The historical cellar is the only original part of the building which survived World War II and during the Soviet Occupation. Until the early 1990s it was buried underground and not visible. The historic cellar is one of the few places where it is possible to walk through an authentic underground of Old Riga, where the remains — wall fragments, floor and even the wooden stairs are original, and some of that is dated as far back as the 14th century. This was former storage for goods and part of it was space for a hypocaust or warm air furnace. Today there are interesting, interactive exhibitions relating to commerce in Riga and the history of the Brotherhood of Blackheads.

See also
House of the Blackheads in Tallinn

References

External links

Home page

Buildings and structures in Riga
House of the Blackheads
Rebuilt buildings and structures in Latvia
Demolished buildings and structures in Latvia
Buildings and structures demolished in 1948